The MRT Pink Line is an elevated mass rapid transit monorail train line under construction in Bangkok and Nonthaburi Province, Thailand. It will run in the northern part of the city from the Nonthaburi Civic Center in Pak Kret District Nonthaburi along the major east–west transport corridor of Chaeng Wattana and Ram Intra roads to terminate at Minburi District in east Bangkok.

The line is designed to link the northern areas of Bangkok and Nonthaburi by connecting with five mass transit lines. At Nonthaburi Civic Center the line interchanges with the MRT Purple Line and the proposed MRT Brown Line. The line also interchanges with the SRT Dark Red Line, the BTS Sukhumvit Line and the planned BMA Grey Line. At the Min Buri terminus, the line interchanges with the under construction MRT Orange Line.

Construction of the MRT Pink Line began in December 2017. In October 2020, the BSR consortium stated that they aimed to open the first section of the Pink Line by October 2021, with services initially operating from Min Buri (PK30) to Government Complex (PK12). The complete line was originally set to be fully open by June 2022. However, the outbreak of COVID-19 in Bangkok and changes to station locations has delayed the opening date. On 24 September 2021, the MRTA Board granted a 290-day extension to the construction contract period. In November 2021, the MRTA Board approved a new phased opening of the line starting from August 2022.  On 9 December 2021, daily testing conducted at a maximum speed of 25 km/h began on a short 4 km section of the line between the depot at Min Buri and Bang Chan station. After a period of 3 months, testing will be conducted at higher speeds and along a longer section of track.

However, in mid April 2022 the acting Director-General of the Department of Rail Transport stated that the line would not begin full testing until September 2022 and that the first stage would not open until late December 2022. By the end of November 2022, construction progress is at 94.00%. The line will open in two stages.

Phase 1: July 2023 - Min Buri (PK30) to Government Complex (PK12) (except Nopparat (PK26)) - 21 km (Control Group Public Trial Run)
Phase 2: August 2023 - Min Buri (PK30) to Nonthaburi Civic Center (PK01) - 34.5 km

Route Alignment
The line begins at Nonthaburi Civic Center near Khae Rai Junction, Nonthaburi Province, in the northwest of Greater Bangkok. The line then heads north along Tiwanon Road to Pak Kret Intersection, Pak Kret District, before turning east to run along Chaeng Watthana road. It interchanges with the SRT Dark Red Line at Lak Si Station and passes over Vibhavadi Rangsit Road running east through the Ram Intra intersection and the Lak Si monument in Bang Khen District, where it crosses under the BTS Sukhumvit Line and interchanges with Wat Phra Sri Mahathat. The line then continues farther east along Ram Intra Road to the northeast of Bangkok before terminating at Min Buri where it finally interchanges with the MRT Orange Line at Min Buri station (OR28).

History
The MRT Pink Line was first proposed in 2005 by the Office of Transport and Traffic Policy and Planning as a heavy rail underground line. It was changed to a monorail line in 2008 to reduce construction costs. The director-general of the Office of Transport and Traffic Policy and Planning had previously stated in an interview that the Pink Line was considered a priority scheme to be completed by 2017–18, as it ran past the then recently opened Bangkok Government Complex. A review was undertaken in early 2012 to reconsider the heavy rail option, but cost restraints prevailed and the Office decided to continue with the monorail plan. The review of the line did result, however, in the addition of 6 new stations. The environmental impact assessment for the Pink Line was finalized in late 2012. In October 2012, members of the new government requested to extend the planned line east by 3.4 km beyond the Min Buri terminus to Nong Chok. However, this extension of the line was not approved. The expected cost of the line in 2012 with the additional 6 extra stations was 55 billion baht.

The MRT Pink line was due to be tendered in the third quarter of 2013 with construction due to commence in early 2014. However, delays in preparation of the tender in relation to the selection of monorail rolling stock and political protests resulting in a snap national election in early Feb 2014 further delayed the Pink Line tender. A coup in May 2014 resulted in a new military administration and the tender being deferred while a review of all mass transit projects was undertaken for a period of 18 months. The MRT Pink line tender was then changed to a PPP tender process which was not released until mid 2016.

The BSR consortium consisting of BTS Group Holdings (75% majority stake) with Sino-Thai Engineering and Construction STEC, and Ratch Group (RATCH) won the bid in early December 2016 to construct and operate the MRT Pink Line.  The BSR consortium won the bid for a 30-year concession operate the line and also won the bid to build and operate the MRT Yellow Line.

On 16 June 2017, contracts were signed by the BSR consortium with the Mass Rapid Transit Authority of Thailand.  The BSR established the Northern Bangkok Monorail Company Limited (NBM) to operate the line.

Construction Progress
Construction of the MRT Pink Line began in December 2017 with the BSR consortium establishing a number of preparation work sites and closing lanes along the east-west Chaeng Wattana-Ram Inthra corridor. By 30 September 2018, overall construction was 10.37% complete. Construction work on Tiwanon Road began at the end of October 2018 with the temporary closure of long stretches of the middle lanes between Khae Rai and Pak Kret intersections. Construction had progressed to 31.46% complete by the end of March 2019. By the end of July 2019, completion of civil constructions had further progressed to 40.13%. Overall construction was 48.15% complete at the end of November 2019. By the end of January 2020, construction had progressed to 51.96%. By the end of May 2020, construction had progressed to 58.78%. At the end of July 2020, construction had progressed to 61.83%. At the end of September 2020, construction was 66.31% complete. Construction was 70.32% complete by the end of December 2020. Construction progress was 74.14% complete by the end of February 2021. Construction progress was 77.57% complete by the end of April 2021. Construction progress was 83.40% by the end of October 2021. Construction progress was 84.45% by the end of November 2021.

The terminus station at Nonthaburi Civic Center (PK01) has been moved 337m closer to the Esplanade at Khae Rai junction due to objections from civil servants working at the Nonthaburi provincial office who were concerned that their view of the outside would be obstructed. A new EIA was completed for the relocation but the new station location required Cabinet approval, causing delays to the opening of this section of the line. The Cabinet agreed to the amended EIA for the relocation of both stations on 20 October 2020. On 24 September, the MRTA Board granted a 290-day extension to the construction contract schedule due to station design changes at Noppharat Ratchathani station (PK26) due to a new overpass plan, the relocation of Nonthaburi Civic Center station (PK01) and a flood mitigation project by the Highway Department impacting on the construction timeline of Laksi District (PK13), Chaeng Watthana Government Complex (PK 12) and Chaeng Watthana 14 stations (PK 11).

On 9 December 2021, daily testing conducted at a maximum speed of 25 km/h began on a  short 4 km section of the line from the depot at Miniburi to Bang Chan station. After a period of 3 months, testing will be conducted at higher speeds along a longer section of the line.

By the end of March 2022, construction progress is at 86.51%.

Muang Thong Thani Branch Line
In 2016, the BTSC received a fund for an extension to link Impact, Muang Thong Thani and the Muang Thong Thani condominium buildings from Bangkok Land Public Company Limited. Accordingly, the BSR joint venture proposed a 2.8 km, 2 station spur monorail route to link to Impact, Muang Thong Thani from Si Rat station. The two stations will be located adjacent to the Impact Challenger building near Muang Thong Thani Lake and the Impact Forum. In early August 2018, a second public hearing was conducted by the MRTA into the extension proposal.

The spur line proposal required a new EIA, which was completed in August 2020. The proposal was then presented to the Cabinet for approval to commence construction before the end of 2020. On 22 October 2020, the National Environment Board chaired by the Deputy PM approved the EIA and the MRTA evaluated construction costs of the spur line with BSR, with the final proposal proposed to be presented to Cabinet for approval by the end of November 2020. On 9 February 2021, Cabinet approved the 2.8 km spur line which is expected to cost 3.37 billion baht. Construction of the spur line was due to commence in July 2021. However, due to COVID-19 outbreaks in greater Bangkok construction has been delayed until December 2021.

The MRTA may also consider a further 2 km extension in the future from Muang Thong Thani to Tiwanon road.

Rolling stock
The BSR selected Bombardier Innovia Monorail 300 rolling stock for the MRT Pink Line. The BSR announced that they will purchase 42 four-car sets to operate the line. The total order of 70 sets of trains for the MRT Pink and MRT Yellow lines will cost 50 billion baht. These trains will be manufactured by CRRC Puzhen Bombardier Transportation Systems (joint venture of Bombardier Transportation and CRRC Nanjing Puzhen) in Wuhu, Anhui, China. The first set was shipped on 4 September 2020 and arrived in Thailand on 1 October at Laem Chabang port with a handover ceremony attended by the Thai Prime Minister, the Bangkok Mass Transit System PLC. (BTSC) Chairman, MRTA and the Canadian Ambassador to Thailand. By July 2021, 8 sets had been delivered and were being tested. All sets were due to be delivered by early 2022. However, as of mid April 2022 only 24 sets had been received and were progressively undergoing testing.

The remaining sets are expected to be delivered by July 2022.

Technical Characteristics
 Low profile vehicles/low floor height above beam 
 Distinct sloped nose/end-cap
 Inter-car walkthrough
 Rubber-tires and permanent magnet motor
 Aluminum body, steel underframe, composite end cap
 4 caer sets have a capacity of 24,100 pax p/h each way and 8 car sets a capacity of 49.600 pax p/h each way with a 75-second headway.

Innovia Monorails are all fully automated and are equipped with CITYFLO 650 communications-based train control for driverless operation to increase reliability, shorten head ways between trains and lower maintenance costs.

Guidebeams
The Bombardier Innovia Monorail 300 operates on a narrow, elevated guide beam. Pre-cast, post-tensioned guide beams are constructed at an off-site location and later installed on the system. The guide beams are 690mm wide. The Innovia Monorail 300 was designed to navigate curves as tight as 46 m and a maximum grade of 6%. Monorail switches will be either beam replacement or multi-position pivot switches. The system will have evacuation walkways down the entire length of the guide beam. These walkways will allow passengers to escape onboard hazards. These walkways will be used by the maintenance crew for repairs and general maintenance to the system.

List of stations 

Originally, the line was designed with 24 stations, two of which with a park and ride facility. However, six new stations were added in mid-2012 for a total of 30 stations.

Network Map

See also 

 Mass Rapid Transit Master Plan in Bangkok Metropolitan Region
 MRT (Bangkok)
 MRT Blue Line
 MRT Brown Line
 MRT Grey Line
 MRT Light Blue Line
 MRT Orange Line
 MRT Purple Line
 MRT Yellow Line
 BTS Skytrain
 BTS Sukhumvit Line
 BTS Silom Line
 Airport Rail Link (Bangkok)
 SRT Light Red Line
 SRT Dark Red Line
 Bangkok BRT
 BMA Gold Line

References

External links
 "MRTA Pink Line website" 
 "2Bangkok Pink Line thread" Historical updates and articles (In English)
 Airport Rail Link, BTS, MRT & BRT network map
 MRTA

Pink line
Proposed public transport in Thailand
2023 in rail transport
Monorails in Thailand
Monorails